Vriesea dubia is a plant species in the genus Vriesea. This species is native to Peru, Colombia, and Ecuador.

Cultivars
 Vriesea 'Elan'

References

dubia
Flora of South America
Epiphytes
Plants described in 1955